Samuel O'Connell Howard (born December 23, 1992) is an American soccer player who currently plays as a goalkeeper for Hartford Athletic in the USL Championship.

Career
Howard attended La Salle University from 2013 to 2015. He graduated in 2015 and spent a graduate year at Howard University, making 92 saves in 18 appearances during the 2015 season. Howard also competed in the National Premier Soccer League for the ASA Charge in 2015.

Howard spent the 2016 and 2017 seasons with IFK Åmål in the Swedish lower leagues. He made 68 appearances for the Swedish club, compiling a 48–15–5 career record that included 16 total clean sheets.

Howard was signed by Fresno FC of the United Soccer League on April 13, 2018, for the remainder of the USL Season. Howard was signed after trialing with the Chicago Fire prior to the start of the 2018 Major League Soccer season. Howard was re-signed for the 2019 season, which was announced on 11/29/18. Howard made no USL Championship appearances during the 2019 season, however he started both US Open Cup matches for the club, a 1–0 win again El Farolito in San Francisco, and a 1–0 extra time loss against Sacramento Republic.

On April 9, 2020, Howard joined USL League One side Union Omaha ahead of their inaugural season. He was released by Omaha following their 2020 season.

On February 24, 2021, Howard joined USL Championship club OKC Energy FC.

Howard signed with Hartford Athletic of the USL Championship on July 22, 2022.

References

External links 

NISA profile

1992 births
Living people
American soccer players
Association football goalkeepers
La Salle Explorers men's soccer players
Howard Bison men's soccer players
Northern Virginia Royals players
Fresno FC players
Union Omaha players
OKC Energy FC players
American expatriate soccer players
Expatriate footballers in Sweden
National Premier Soccer League players
USL League Two players
USL League One players
Soccer players from Maryland
National Independent Soccer Association players